Campo dos Afonsos may refer to:

 Afonsos Air Force Base (Campo dos Afonsos), a Brazilian Air Force base
 Campo dos Afonsos, Rio de Janeiro, a district in Rio de Janeiro